Sturgess is a surname. Notable people with the surname include:

 Albert Sturgess (1882–1957), English footballer
 Claire Sturgess (born 1967), British disc jockey
 Colin Sturgess (born 1968), British road and track cyclist
Dawn Sturgess (1974–2018), British poison victim
 Eric Sturgess (born 1920), South African tennis player
 Gary Sturgess (21st century), Australian businessperson
 Jim Sturgess (born 1978), English actor
 John Sturgess (19th century), English artist
 Kylie Sturgess (21st century), Australian educator and researcher
 Olive Sturgess (born 1933), Canadian-American actress
 Paul Sturgess (born 1987), British basketball player
 Reginald Sturgess (1892–1932), Australian artist
 Sydney Sturgess (1915–1999), Canadian actress
 Thomas Sturgess (1898–1974), Indian cricketer

See also
 Sturges

English-language surnames